Carex jonesii is a species of sedge known by the common name Jones' sedge. It is native to the Western United States and grows in moist habitats.

Description
Carex jonesii produces clumps of stems up to about 60 centimeters tall, surrounded by scraps of the previous year's herbage tangled with tufts of new leaves. The dense inflorescence is one or two centimeters long, containing tangles of gold and black scaled flowers.

Distribution and habitat
This sedge is native to the Western United States from California to Montana to Colorado, where it grows in moist areas, especially in subalpine mountain habitat.

References

External links
Jepson Manual Treatment — Carex jonesii
USDA Plants Profile: Carex jonesii
Flora of North America
Carex jonesii — Photo gallery

jonesii
Flora of the Western United States
Flora of Oregon
Flora of California
Flora of the Sierra Nevada (United States)
Natural history of the Transverse Ranges
~
Plants described in 1889
Flora without expected TNC conservation status
Taxa named by Liberty Hyde Bailey